was the fourth and final daimyō of Kuroishi Domain in northern Mutsu Province, Honshū, Japan (modern-day Aomori Prefecture). His courtesy title was Shikibu-no-shō, and his Court rank under the Tokugawa shogunate was Junior Fifth Rank, Lower Grade.

Biography
Tsugaru Tsugumichi was the son of Tsugaru Yukitomo, from a branch line of the Tsugaru clan, and was adopted by the 3rd daimyō of Kuroishi, Tsugaru Tsuguyasu, as official heir due to the lack of a male descendant on Tsuguyasu’s death in 1851. He changed his name at the time from Tsugaru Tomozumi  to Tsugaru Tsugumichi.

Tsugumichi became daimyō during the turbulent Bakumatsu period, during which time the Tsugaru clan first sided with the pro-imperial forces of Satchō Alliance, and attacked nearby Shōnai Domain. However, the Tsugaru soon switched course, and briefly joined the Ōuetsu Reppan Dōmei. However, for reasons yet unclear, the Tsugaru backed out of the alliance and re-joined the imperial cause after a few months, participating in several battles in the Imperial cause during the Boshin War, notably that of the Battle of Noheji, and Battle of Hakodate.

After the Meiji Restoration, with the abolition of the han system, Tsugumichi was appointed Imperial Governor of Kuroishi from 1869 to 1871, at which time the territory was absorbed into the new Aomori Prefecture. He relocated to Tokyo, and with the establishment of the kazoku peerage system in 1882, he was awarded with the title of shishaku (viscount). He became a member of the House of Peers in 1890. In his later years, he was noted for his waka poems. On his death, he was posthumously granted Third court rank. His grave is at the Yanaka Cemetery in Taitō-ku, Tokyo.

See also
Tsugaru clan

References
 The content of much of this article was derived from that of the corresponding article on Japanese Wikipedia.

Further reading
 Kurotaki, Jūjirō (1984). Tsugaru-han no hanzai to keibatsu 津軽藩の犯罪と刑罰. Hirosaki: Hoppō shinsha.
 Narita, Suegorō (1975). Tsugaru Tamenobu: shidan 津軽為信: 史談. Aomori: Tōō Nippōsha.
 Tsugaru Tsuguakira Kō Den kankōkai (1976). Tsugaru Tsuguakira kō-den 津輕承昭公傳. Tokyo: Rekishi Toshosha

External links
 "Hirosaki-jō" (February 17, 2008)
 "Tsugaru-han" on Edo 300 HTML (February 17, 2008)

Tozama daimyo
Tsugaru clan
1840 births
1903 deaths
Kazoku
People of the Boshin War
People of Meiji-period Japan
Members of the House of Peers (Japan)